Giersch is a German language surname. It stems from the female given name Gertrude – and may refer to:
Carlo Giersch (born 1937), German entrepreneur and merchant
Herbert Giersch (1921–2010), German economist

References

German-language surnames
Surnames from given names